The Welsh Federation of Coarse Anglers (WFCA) is the national governing body for coarse fishing in Wales. It was established in 1977 and by 2003 had 69 affiliated clubs and over 23,000 members.

The Welsh Federation of Coarse Anglers is based at Briton Ferry, Neath Port Talbot.

See also
Federation of Welsh Anglers
Welsh Federation of Sea Anglers
Welsh Salmon and Trout Angling Association

References

Sports governing bodies in Wales
Recreational fishing in Wales
1977 establishments in Wales